Massimo Ceciliani (Sondrio, 5 January 1997) is an Italian rugby union player. His usual position is as a Hooker and from 2018 he plays for Calvisano in Top10. 

He played for Zebre from 2018 to 2022.

In 2017, Ceciliani was named in the Italy Under-20 squad.

References

External links 
It's Rugby profile 

1997 births
Living people
Italian rugby union players
Zebre Parma players
Rugby union hookers
Rugby Viadana players